Epping is an electoral district of the Legislative Assembly in the Australian state of New South Wales. It is represented by Premier Dominic Perrottet of the Liberal Party.

It includes the suburbs of Beecroft, Cheltenham, Cherrybrook, North Epping and parts of Epping, Carlingford, Castle Hill, Dural, Eastwood, Pennant Hills and West Pennant Hills.

The seat was created in 1999, largely replacing Eastwood. Like its predecessor, it is a comfortably safe Liberal seat.

Members for Epping

Election results

References

Epping
Epping
1999 establishments in Australia